St. Anne's Chapel may refer to:

 St Ann's Chapel, Cornwall
 St. Anne's Chapel (Fredericton)
 St. Anne's Chapel, Pińczów
 St Anne's Chapel, Qrendi